Santamaria (also spelled Santamaría or Santa Maria) is a surname from the Latin Arch in Europe. The name, a reference to the Blessed Virgin Mary meaning Holy Mary or Saint Mary, means the same thing in the Spanish, Italian, Portuguese and Catalan languages. In Arabic, the equivalent name is Mariam. The surname has spread to the Americas, especially South America, via immigration and colonisation.

Notable people with the surname include:

 Santamaria (footballer) (born 1982), Portuguese footballer
 Abel Santamaría (1927–1953), leader in the Cuban Revolutionary movement
 Adriana Martin Santamaria (born 1986), Spanish international footballer
 Álvaro Santamaría (born 1950), Colombian former footballer
 Anderson Santamaría (born 1992), Peruvian football central defender
 Aristodemo Santamaria (1892–1974), Italian footballer
 Arno Santamaria (born 1978), French singer-songwriter
 B. A. Santamaria (1915–1998), Australian political activist and journalist
 Baptiste Santamaria (born 1995), French footballer
 Borja García Santamaría (born 1990), Spanish footballer
 Carlos Sanz de Santamaría (1905–1992), 18th Permanent Representative of Colombia to the UN
 Carmen Quesada Santamaría (born 1969), Costa Rican politician and teacher
 Christian Santamaría (born 1972), retired Honduran football player
 Claudio Santamaria (born 1974), Italian actor
 David Santamaria (born 1990), American soccer player
 Dom Santamaria (born 1979), drummer from the Australian band Epicure
 Domingo Caycedo Santamaria, former Vice-president of Gran Colombia
 Elvira Santamaría (1929–1999), Argentine ballet dancer, milonguera and choreographer
 Enrique Sanz de Santamaría (born 1974), Colombian-American sports executive
 Eva Santamaría (born 1971), Spanish singer
 Fabio Santamaria (born 1925), Cuban wrestler
 Gorka Santamaría (born 1995), Spanish footballer
 Grimoaldo Santamaria (1883–1902), Italian Roman Catholic clerical student from the Passionists
 Guillermo París Sanz de Santamaría (1820–1867), Colombian businessman
 Guillermo Silva Santamaria (1921–2007), Colombian painter, printmaker and Surrealist
 Haydée Santamaría (1922–1980), Cuban revolutionary and politician
 Higinio Ortúzar Santamaria (1915–1982), Chilean footballer
 Ignacio Pérez Santamaria, Spanish retired footballer 
 Ingrid Sala Santamaria, Filipina pianist
 Jodi Santamaria, Filipina actress
 José Santamaría (born 1929), Uruguayan football player and coach
 José Luis Santamaría (born 1973), Spanish footballer
 José Antonio Santamaría (1946–1993), Spanish footballer
 Josep Santamaría (born 1957), Spanish politician
 Joseph Santamaria (born 1948), Australian jurist and judge of the Court of Appeal of the Supreme Court of Victoria
 Juan Santamaría (1831–1856), national hero of Costa Rica
 Kamahl Santamaria (born 1980), New Zealand television journalist
 Kevin Santamaría (born 1991), Salvadoran footballer
 Luis Santamaría (born 1975), Honduran footballer
 Luis Fraiz Santamaria (born 1993), Panamanian football
 María Elena Santamaría Gómez, Mexican pro wrestler
 Maria Helen Bella Avenila Santamaria, Filipino actress and singer 
 Mario Santamaria (born 1950), Nicaraguan boxer
 Mauricio Cárdenas Santamaría (born 1962), Colombian politician and 69th Minister of Finance
 Mauricio Santa María Salamanca (born 1966), Colombian economist and politician
 Miguel Álvarez Santamaría (born 1945), Mexican politician
 Mikel Santamaría (born 1987), Spanish footballer
 Mongo Santamaría (1917–2003), Afro-Cuban Latin jazz percussionist
 Monika Santa Maria, Filipina-Malaysian fashion model
 Nadia Calviño Santamaría (born 1968), Spanish economist and civil servant
 Nathalie Santamaria (born 1973), French singer
 Orlando Santamaría (1920–1992), Cuban sports shooter
 Pedro Santamaría, Spanish cyclist
 Roberto Santamaría Ciprián, Spanish footballer
 Roberto Santamaría Calavia, Spanish footballer
 Sabrina Santamaria (born 1993), American tennis player of Filipino and Panamanian descent
 Santi Santamaria (1957–2011), Spanish Catalan chef
 Santiago Santamaría (1952–2013), Argentine footballer
 Sendy Santamaria (born 1996), American artist
 Sergio Santamaría (born 1980), Spanish footballer
 Soraya Sáenz de Santamaría (born 1971), Spanish People's Party politician
 Stéphane Santamaria (born 1977), French canoeist
 Wilson Santamaría (born 1981), Bolivian lawyer, politician, and sociologist
 Yūsuke Santamaria (born 1971), stage name of Yūsuke Santamaria, a Japanese playwright, singer and graphics designer

See also 
 Santa Maria (disambiguation)

References